The Royal Society of Sculptors is a British charity established in 1905 which promotes excellence in the art and practice of sculpture. Its headquarters are a centre for contemporary sculpture on Old Brompton Road, South Kensington, London. It is the oldest and largest organisation dedicated to sculpture in the UK. Until 2017, it was the Royal British Society of Sculptors.

The Royal Society of Sculptors is a registered charity with a selective membership of around 700 professional sculptors, promoting excellence in the art and practice of sculpture. It aims to inspire, inform and engage people of all ages and backgrounds with sculpture, and to support sculptors' development of their practice to the highest professional standards.

History

1905: Began as the Society of British Sculptors, with 51 sculptor members in its first year
1911: Received royal patronage, and was renamed the Royal Society of British Sculptors
1963: Gained charitable status in recognition of its educational activities
1976: Received donation of 108 Old Brompton Road from the late sculptor Cecil Thomas
2003: Became Royal British Society of Sculptors in recognition of growing international membership
 2017: Became the Royal Society of Sculptors.

Structure

Patronage 
The society has received Royal Patronage since 1911 and Her Majesty, Queen Elizabeth II is the society's current Patron.

Governance 
The society was founded as a company limited by guarantee in 1905 and has been a registered charity since 1963. It is a selective membership-based organisation, whose members elect its governing council.. The council meets regularly to review applications and select new members.

Membership 
There are two types of membership: Members (formerly known as Associates until 2014) and Fellows, who are entitled to use the MRSS and FRSS post-nominal letters. Presidents of the society are entitled to use the post-nominal letters PRSS and Vice Presidents VPRSS.

Awards

Current

First Plinth: Public Art Award 
Formerly FIRST@108: Public Art Award, the First Plinth is a biennial £10,000 award to contribute towards the production costs of producing a large-scale sculpture, thereby offering competing sculptors the opportunity to extend their practice into competing for public art commissions. Open to any artist working in three dimensions. The award is supported by the Mirisch & Lebenheim Charitable Foundation. The current winner of the First Plinth: Public Art Award 2021 is Polly Morgan.

Past winners

Grizedale Residency 
With thanks to the Brian Mercer Charitable Trust the Society offers an annual residency opportunity based at Grizedale Forest. This intensive six week long residency aims to foster experimentation and innovation in response to the natural environment.

Past Winners

 Susan Stockwell (2021)
Florian Houlker (2021)
Karolin Schwab (2019)
 Ben Allan (2019)

Spotlight Award 
Founded in 2017, Contemporary Sculpture Fulmer is a private sculpture park in Buckinghamshire which surveys the breadth of contemporary sculptural practice. A new area of woodland has been opened out to create an environment for an artist to install a single large work or a series of works creating a solo installation. Society members and fellows are invited to propose new or recent work that is suitable for display outside over summer. The Spotlight exhibition is included on the route taken by all visitors to the gardens, but it is also separate and distinct from the rest of the sculpture trail, and as such applicants are encouraged to engage with the idea of it as a solo exhibition en plain air. The successful applicant works closely with director George Marsh. The current winner is Daniel Solomons.

Past Winners

 Tim Ellis (2021)
Rosie Leventon (2020)
 Amale Freiha Khlat (2019)
 Marco Miehling (2018)

Gilbert Bayes Award
Established in 2000 as the RBS Bursary Awards, it was renamed in 2018 after the artist Gilbert Bayes, whose charitable trust supports the awards. This is an annual award made to a small group of emerging sculptors that the society has judged to be of outstanding talent and potential. It is designed to aid them in the transition to full professional practice, by giving them a package of professional support including an annual membership of the society. The award is open to sculptors of any age, nationality, with or without formal training and working in any medium. Past winners include: Alex Chinneck, Tessa Farmer and William Mackrell.

Eilean Shona Residency 
The wilderness island of Eilean Shona has long been an inspiration for artists and writers. To further build upon this legacy, a members-only residency has been created - a month-long opportunity for a winning member of the Royal Society of Sculptors to live on the island and reflect upon and respond to the natural environment.

Past Winners

 Mhairi Vari (2022)

Red House Residency 
For Benjamin Britten – one of the foremost composers of the 20th century – a quiet place to compose was absolutely essential. He was fortunate enough to achieve this for most of his life, spending his last two decades at The Red House, down a quiet lane on the outskirts of Aldeburgh, Suffolk. This new creative retreat at The Red House is open to women members of the Royal Society of Sculptors to spend time in Suffolk on a peaceful, creative retreat.

Past Winners

 Hannah Honeywill (2020)
Thread Residency

Thread is a residency program and cultural centre that allows local and international artists to live and work in Sinthian, a rural village in Tambacounda, the southeastern region of Senegal. It houses two artists’ dwellings, as well as ample indoor and outdoor studio space.

Past Winners

 Julian Wild (2020)

Past Awards

Brian Mercer Residencies
Two annual scholarships for society members to experiment with stone or bronze under instruction from master craftsmen in Pietrasanta, Italy enable sculptors to learn the technical aspects of the carving or casting process were supported by the Brian Mercer Charitable Trust.

Lady Feodora Gleichen Memorial Fund (1938 – 1988)

The Feodora Gleichen Memorial Fund was an annual award of £100 for women sculptors and was made from works shown at the Royal Academy Summer Exhibition or any other exhibition at which works by female sculptors were shown. The Funds were administered by the Royal Academy from 1923 – 1938, after which management passed into the hands of the Royal Society of Sculptors. The fund was established following the death of Lady Feodora Gleichen, who was posthumously voted as one of the first female members of the Society alongside Christine Gregory and Flora Kendrick. Winners included Anne Acheson, Rosamund Fletcher, Karen Jonzen, Lorne McKean and Olivia Musgrave.

Otto Beit medal
For many years the society awarded the Otto Beit medal, named after and funded by the philanthropist Sir Otto Beit. Winners of the medal include Michael Clark, Sean Crampton, Philip Jackson, Franta Belsky, David Annand, Dennis Huntley, John W. Mills, Michael Rizzello and Judith Bluck.

Sculpture Shock
Launched in 2013, Sculpture Shock encouraged surprising site-specific spatial interventions in non-traditional spaces outside the confines of a gallery. Three sculptors were awarded £3,000 and a three-month residency in Kensington. The artists then exhibited in one of three environments: Subterranean (the unseen world underneath the city), Ambulatory (without physical confines in movement through space and time) and Historic (an illustrious building in London). Sculpture Shock was supported by private philanthropists.

References

External links

British sculpture
Organisations based in London with royal patronage
Charities based in London
Sculptors
Art societies
Grade II listed buildings in the Royal Borough of Kensington and Chelsea
1905 establishments in the United Kingdom